Bakulin (masculine) or Bakulina (feminine) is a Russian last name.

There are two theories regarding the origins of this last name. According to the first one, it is a variety of the last name Abakumov, which is derived from a patronymic, itself derived from various forms of the Christian male first name Avvakum. However, it is also possible that this last name is related to the last name Bakunin, both of which derive from dialectal Russian words "" (bakulya) and "" (bakunya), meaning, depending on the dialect, chatterbox, talkative person or agile, business-like person.

The following people share this last name:
 Alex Bakulin, general manager of Volzhanin, a Russian bus lease holding company
 Alexey Bakulin, People's Commissar of Transport of the Soviet Union in 1937–1938
 Arkadi Bakulin, First Team Coach of FC Astana, a Kazakh association football team
 Barbara Bakulin, a member of the Polish team at the 1972 Summer Olympics Women's 4×100 meters relay
 Ivan Bakulin, several people
 Maria Bakulina, Russian center basketball player for WBC Dynamo Novosibirsk
 Natalia Bakulina, 2001 Miss International contestant from Ukraine
 Nicholas Savich Bakulin (1869-1962), Russian painter
Nikolay Bakulin, winner of Moscow City Chess Championship in 1964 and 1966
 Sergey Bakulin (b. 1986), Russian race walker
 Vitaly Bakulin (b. 1983), Russian association football player
 Vladimir Bakulin (1939–2012), Soviet Olympic wrestler
 Yelena Bakulina, one of the victims of Soviet serial killer Andrei Chikatilo
 Yevhen Bakulin, member of the Supervisory Board of Ukrnafta, a Ukrainian oil and natural gas extracting company

See also
Bakulino, several rural localities in Russia

References

Notes

Sources
И. М. Ганжина (I. M. Ganzhina). "Словарь современных русских фамилий" (Dictionary of Modern Russian Last Names). Москва, 2001. 



Russian-language surnames